La nonne sanglante (The Bloody Nun) is a five-act opera by Charles Gounod to a libretto by Eugène Scribe and Germain Delavigne. Written between 1852 and 1854, it was first produced on 18 October 1854 at the Salle Le Peletier by the Paris Opéra. It received 11 performances between October and November 1854. Its poor reception, in the midst of various crises, contributed to the overthrow of the Opéra director Nestor Roqueplan, who was replaced by his adversary François Crosnier. Crosnier immediately cancelled the run, saying that 'such filth' (pareilles ordures) would no longer be tolerated.

Performance history 
Although the first run sold well, Gounod's opera disappeared completely for a very long time. After the unfortunate beginning, no other opera manager took the risk. One year later, British composer Edward James Loder presented his version of the subject, Raymond and Agnes. This opera was first shown in Manchester and was brought to London in 1859. Loder's version was not very successful either. It was revived only once, 1866 in Cambridge.

In 2008, Theater Osnabrück and its music director Hermann Bäumer presented La nonne sanglante for the first time on a German stage. On 2 June 2018 the opera had a rare Paris revival at the Opéra Comique with Michael Spyres as Rodolphe, Jodie Devos as Arthur, Jean Teitgen as Pierre and Marion Lebègue as the nun, conducted by Laurence Equilbey, and directed by David Bobée.

Roles

Synopsis
Place: Bohemia
Time: 11th century

Prologue
Agnès is in love with Rodolphe, although the two families are perpetually at war with each other. Moldaw's castle is said to be haunted by the bloody figure of a nun.

Act 1
Pierre, the hermit, breaks up a row between the family vassals and abjures them to join his crusade. He proposes that Agnès should marry Rodoplhe's brother Théobald to cement relations between the families. The lovers agree that to escape, Agnès should disguise herself as the ghost of the nonne sanglante and elope with him at midnight.

Act 2
Arthur sings of the legend of la nonne saglante. At Rodolphe's rendez-vous, he walks off with the ghost of the nun, believing it to be Agnès. The ghosts of Rodolphe's ancestors materialise in the magically-restored family castle to witness the marriage of Rodolphe and the nun.

Act 3
Théobald has been killed in battle, so Rodolphe is in theory free to marry Agnès. However, Rodolphe reveals to Arthur that he is nightly haunted by the nun who reminds him of his vows.  She eventually reveals that Rodolphe can only be released by killing the (unidentified) man who murdered her.

Act 4
At the marriage feast of Rodophe and Agnès, the nun's ghost appears at midnight and indicates to Rodolphe that his father, Ludorf, was her murderer. Rodolphe abandons the ceremonies in horror, reigniting the ancient mutual hatred of the families.

Act 5
Ludorf is consumed by guilt for his crime and will accept punishment if he can meet with Rodolphe for one last time. He overhears Moldaw's retainers planning to kidnap Rodolphe. Rodolphe then appears with Agnès and confesses to her the story of the ghost. To save his son, Ludorf presents himself to Moldaw's men as his son, and is murdered by them, dying in his son's arms at the tomb of the murdered nun. This act of expiation is clearly acceptable to the ghost who ascends to heaven praying for Ludorf.

Note: The story was very loosely adapted by Scribe from an episode in The Monk, a gothic novel by Matthew Lewis. The libretto was originally considered by "eight other composers, including Giuseppe Verdi and Hector Berlioz", who wrote a few fragments before abandoning it.

Recording
 Hermann Bäumer, Conductor, Osnabruck Symphony Orchestra, Chorus of Theater Osnabrück; Yoonki Baek (Rodolphe), Eva Schneidereit (La nonne sanglante), Natalia Atmanchuk (Agnes). CPO777 388-2
Laurence Equilbey, Conductor, Insula Orchestra, Choeur Accentus, Michael Spyres (Rodolphe), Marion Lebègue (La nonne sanglante), Vannina Santoni (Agnès), Jérôme Boutillier (Le Comte), Jodie Devos (Arthur), Jean Teitgen (Pierre L'Ermite), Luc Bertin-Hugault (Le baron), Enquerrand De Hys (Fritz), stage Director David Bobée. DVD or Blu-ray Naxos 2019.

References

Operas
1854 operas
French-language operas
Operas by Charles Gounod
Opera world premieres at the Paris Opera
Operas based on novels
Libretti by Germain Delavigne
Libretti by Eugène Scribe